"Sleepwalker" is a song by American recording artist and American Idol season eight runner-up Adam Lambert. The song was written by Ryan Tedder, Aimee Mayo and Chris Lindsey for Lambert's debut album, For Your Entertainment. The song was written and recorded in 2009. It was released as the seventh and final single from the album on March 25, 2011. Germany was the only selected country where the single was released along with a music video; namely the live performance on the Glam Nation Live live album.

Critical reception
The song received positive reviews. Allmusic called the song "terrific pop" and added that it's "Tedder’s typically icy alienation." Entertainment Weekly was very positive, saying: "Lambert [gets] the chance to earn his power- ballad bona fides on the tense, atmospheric ‘Sleepwalker’." However LA Times called the song "a real throwaway."

Live performances
The song was included on the set list of Lambert's 2010 Glam Nation Tour. Lambert also performed the song on The Tonight Show with Jay Leno in late 2010.

Track listing
CD single
 "Sleepwalker" – 4:25
 "Aftermath" (Live at Glam Nation) – 4:23

Personnel
Adam Lambert - vocals
Ryan Tedder - songwriter and producer
Aimee Mayo - songwriter
Chris Lindsey - songwriter
Orianthi - guitar solo

Source:

Charts

Release history

References

2011 singles
2010s ballads
Adam Lambert songs
Songs written by Ryan Tedder
Songs written by Aimee Mayo
Songs written by Chris Lindsey
2009 songs
Jive Records singles
RCA Records singles
Song recordings produced by Ryan Tedder